The 2015 Houston Baptist Huskies football team represented Houston Baptist University—now known as Houston Christian University—as a member of the Southland Conference during the 2015 NCAA Division I FCS football season. Led by third-year head coach Vic Shealy the Huskies compiled an overall record of 2–9 with a mark of 0–8 in conference play, placing last out of 11 teams in the Southland. Houston Baptist played home games at Husky Stadium in Houston.

Previous season
The 2014 season was the Huskies' first official season in the Southland Conference for football. The Huskies opened a new on-campus stadium. The first game in the new stadium was played on September 6, 2014 vs McMurry University. Husky Stadium on the Dunham Field. The Huskies finished the 2014 season with a 2–9 overall record and a 1–7 record in Southland Conference play to finish in 10th place.

Schedule

* Games were be televised on tape delay.

Game summaries

Bethany College
Sources:

Northern Colorado

Sources:

@ Abilene Christian

Sources:

@ Sam Houston State

Sources:

College of Faith (Homecoming)
See footnote
Sources:

Central Arkansas

Sources:

@ Nicholls

Sources:

Southeastern Louisiana

Sources:

Lamar

Sources:

@ Stephen F. Austin

Sources:

Incarnate Word

Sources:

References

Houston Baptist
Houston Christian Huskies football seasons
Houston Baptist Huskies football